Horton Rounds is a modernist house in the village of Horton, Northamptonshire. The house was built in 1966 by A. A. J. Marshman, a senior partner in Marshman, Warren and Taylor, a regional architectural practice.

In September 2012 the house was listed at Grade II on the National Heritage List for England. In the designation it was stated that, "Along with Peter Lambert Gibbs's own house of 1965, Fernhill in Ashdown Forest, and Robert Harvey's houses in Warwickshire, Horton Rounds is one of the best in the country of a small group of post-war houses clearly influenced by the work of Frank Lloyd Wright."

Description

The house was described by the Pevsner Architectural Guide for Northamptonshire as follows:

The house was built in two phases from 1966; the guest wing being built in the second phase. The family moved into the house in 1972.

In its listing documents for the house, English Heritage reports:

The Marshman family lived in the house until the mid-1980s and the house has had several other owners since; for many years it was in the ownership of the comedy writer Roy Clarke.

References

Grade II listed buildings in Northamptonshire
Grade II listed houses
Houses completed in 1966
Houses in Northamptonshire
Modernist architecture in England
Stone houses
Hackleton